Anne Howard Bailey (July 26, 1924 – November 23, 2006) was an American writer known particularly for her work as a screenwriter and opera librettist.

Life and career
Born and raised in Memphis, Bailey attended Rhodes College, where she graduated in 1945 with a bachelor's degree in creative writing. After college she moved to New York City, where she began writing for theatre and television. She was a regular contributor to the Armstrong Circle Theatre and Appointment with Adventure during the 1950s and was one of the major writers for National Velvet during the 1960s. Her most successful work as a screenwriter was working as a head writer on several different soap operas during the 1980s, including ABC Daytime's General Hospital (1983–1986) and NBC Daytime's Days of Our Lives (1989–1990). She also created the short-lived 1970s soap opera How to Survive a Marriage. After being fired from Days of Our Lives in 1990, Al Rabin was quoted as saying: 
[Bailey is] a wonderful writer before she got here. She was a wonderful writer here and she will be a wonderful writer in her next project. It's just that the emphasis shifted slightly from romance to adventure. Since we preferred the audience that we had, we will be shifting back.

For General Hospital Bailey notably created such characters as Frisco Jones, Dr. Tony Jones, and Felicia Jones. She also was the head writer for NBC's Santa Barbara between 1987 and 1989, for which she won a Daytime Emmy Award in her final year with the program. Bailey also wrote for prime-time television including work for Bonanza, Moment of Truth, Beacon Hill, and 87th Precinct. She also worked as a story editor for The Adams Chronicles.

As an opera librettist, Bailey wrote librettos for four works. Her first libretto was for Leonard Kastle's Deseret, which is about the life of Brigham Young. The opera was commissioned for television by the NBC Opera Theatre and was first broadcast in 1961. This was followed by a second opera for television, Thomas Pasatieri's The Trial of Mary Lincoln, which was first broadcast on PBS in 1972. For this work Bailey won an Emmy Award.

She collaborated with Pasatieri again for his first full-length opera The Penitentes, which premiered at the Aspen Music Festival in 1974. Her final libretto was for Kenton Coe's Rachel, an opera about United States President Andrew Jackson and his wife, Rachel Donelson Robards, which premiered at Knoxville Opera in 1989.

Death
Bailey died of congestive heart failure in Rancho Mirage, California.

Filmography

Films

Television

Awards and nominations

Daytime Emmy Award

Wins

(1989; Best Writing; Santa Barbara)

Nominations
(1983 & 1984; Best Writing; General Hospital)
(1988; Best Writing; Santa Barbara)

Primetime Emmy Awards

Wins

(1972; Outstanding Writing Achievement in Comedy, Variety or Music; The Trial of Mary Lincoln)

Christopher Award

Wins

(1955; Armstrong Circle Theatre)

Head writing tenure

References

External links

1924 births
2006 deaths
Rhodes College alumni
American soap opera writers
Emmy Award winners
Daytime Emmy Award winners
American opera librettists
Writers from Memphis, Tennessee
Women opera librettists
20th-century American women writers
Women soap opera writers
20th-century American dramatists and playwrights
Screenwriters from Tennessee
20th-century American screenwriters
21st-century American women